Vehicle registration plates of Serbia are issued using a two-letter region code, followed by three or four-digit numeric and a two-letter alpha license code, separated by a hyphen (e.g., BG 123-AA or BG 1234-AA).

Overview
The regional code and the license code are separated by the Serbian cross shield and a Cyrillic letter combination for the region below. 
A blue field is placed along the left side edge, as in European Union countries, bearing the ISO 3166-1 alpha-3 country code for Serbia (SRB).

License numeric code contains combination of three digits (0-9), while two letter alpha code is made of combination of letters using Serbian Latin alphabet order, with addition of letters X, Y and W.

The standard dimensions of a Serbian license plates are 520.5 × 112.9 mm.

Issuance of current license plates started on 1 January 2011 and they were used alongside the old ones during the transitional period until the end of 2011.

Regular license plates

Following are the license plate codes by region in Serbian Cyrillic alphabetical order:

Special license plates 

Serbia has numerous special license plates.

Agriculture plates consist of regional code, Serbian shield, three serial letters and two numbers on lower side; agriculture trailers have two numbers and three letters on lower side; both on green background.
Moped plates have two-letter regional code, Serbian shield, and then numbers; on a yellow background.
Trailer plates have a reversed format of the civilian license plates with serial letter first, Serbian shield  and then numbers and regional code at the end. 
Taxi plates have almost identical format of the civilian license plates with regional code first, Serbian shield and numbers and TX as serial letters. 
Military plates have one letter, an emblem of Serbian armed forces (identical to Serbian shield), and then four numbers. 
Police and fire service plates have letter П (P in Cyrillic), Serbian shield, and then six numbers; on a blue background.

Diplomatic license plates 

Vehicles operated by foreign embassies, consulates, consular and diplomatic staff and various international organizations have been given plates with a distinguishing format of two (or three) numbers, one letter, three numbers, e.g., 12(3)-L-456. Vehicle owned by a diplomat or by accredited non-diplomatic staff carry a plate with characters printed in yellow on a black background while the vehicle owned by a foreign press agency, a foreign cultural representative or by an office of a foreign company and/or its staff, has plates with characters printed in black on a yellow background
The first group of three numbers (123) identifies the country or organization to which the plate has been issued, the second group of three numbers (456) is a serial number. The letter in the middle (L) is denoting the status of the owner.

Additionally, plates have vertically orientated two-letter initials in small letters on the left side (after blue stripe) indicating the city in which they were issued (BG for Belgrade) and two numbers on the right side indicating the year for which they are valid (e.g., 12 for 2012).

References

External links

 Portal posvećen registraciji vozila
 Registracija vozila
 
 Pravilnik o registraciji motornih i priključnih vozila 
 Car Transport in Serbia

Serbia
Transport in Serbia
Serbia transport-related lists
 Registration plates